Sanford H. Calhoun High School is a public high school located in Merrick, New York. Established in 1958, Calhoun is one of three high schools in the Bellmore–Merrick Central High School District, and acts as a magnet school for several programs.

As of the 2018–19 school year, the school had an enrollment of 1,224 students and 110.6 classroom teachers (on an FTE basis), for a student–teacher ratio of 11.1:1. There were 146 students (11.9% of enrollment) eligible for free lunch and 16 (1.3% of students) eligible for reduced-cost lunch.

Hoofbeats 
Hoofbeats is the official student newspaper of Calhoun. The newspaper has won numerous awards, and five editions are produced each year.

Athletics 
Calhoun competes in Section VIII athletics, a compilation of public schools in Nassau County. The fall season hosts boys' and girls' cross country, football, boys' and girls' soccer, girls' tennis, boys' badminton, boys' volleyball, girls' volleyball, cheerleading, and girls' swimming. The winter season hosts wrestling, boys' and girls' basketball, cheerleading, and indoor track, with district teams—including athletes from the other two schools of the district, Mepham and Kennedy—for ice hockey, swimming, diving, rifle, and bowling. The final season, spring, is home to boys' and girls' lacrosse, track and field, baseball, softball, boys' tennis, and girls' badminton.

Calhoun Choral Program 
The Calhoun Choral Program (CCP) is composed of over 160 students, and consists of three groups. Many students belong to more than one group.
 Concert Choir is an auditioned 75-person class composed of tenth, eleventh, and twelfth graders. Each spring, over one-hundred students audition for the incoming group. The group performs a wide variety of three-, four-, six-, and eight-part music, primarily a cappella.
 Chorale, a 3-section class made of over 80 ninth–twelfth grade students, is a group that performs a wide variety of three-part a cappella and accompanied music.
 Crescendo, the most well known of the ensembles, is an auditioned show choir of 24 to 27 students that performs pop-rock literature with choreography.

Calhoun Band Program 
The Calhoun Band Program consists of three main ensembles: Wind Ensemble, Symphonic Band, and Concert Band, as well as the extracurricular Calhoun Rock Band. Each ensemble is under the direction of Mr. Edward Tumminelli. 
 Wind Ensemble is the most advanced of Calhoun's ensembles, consisting of about 40 students (sophomores, juniors, and seniors) selected for the group via. audition. The group is known as Calhoun's Varsity Band (CCVB). Members perform in two concerts each year and take overnight trips to locations including Disney World, Virginia Beach, and Boston.
 Symphonic Band is also composed of sophomores, juniors, and seniors, and performs in two concerts each year. No audition is required for membership.
 Concert Band is Calhoun's freshman band. The group performs in concerts with Symphonic Band. No audition is required for membership. 
 Rock Band is composed of vocalists from Calhoun's Choral Program, as well as students who play rock instruments. The group performs at Sweet Sixteens, Homecoming, and football games.

Calhoun Theatre Program 
Calhoun High School's award-winning theater program, the On Tour Company, began in 1974 and has been successful in producing a wide range of productions each year. Since 1985 the program has been run by Salvatore Salerno of Merrick. Typically, the company stages a Shakespeare play, a straight play, a musical, and an alternating style show each year, in addition to several smaller productions. These include 3 improv nights, the Gotta Sing, Gotta Act and Gotta Dance production and one night of senior one acts each year.  
The On Tour Company also participates in various local community wide events such as street fairs and Shakespeare festivals. The On Tour Company is currently directed by Salvatore Salerno.

Notable alumni 
 David Architzel, U.S. Navy aviator and vice admiral
 Ben Cohen and Jerry Greenfield, of Ben & Jerry's,
 Debbie Gibson, singer and actress
Steve Grilli, baseball player
 Lindsay Lohan, actress, singer and model
 Jeff Mattson, lead guitarist and singer of Dark Star Orchestra
 Dana Milbank, author, political analyst, and columnist for The Washington Post
 Robbie Rosen, American Idol contestant
 Zack Ryder, professional wrestler
 Kevin Shinick, actor, writer, director, and creator of the animated sketch comedy show MAD
Lou Silver, American-Israeli basketball player
 Bruce Sussman, songwriter and librettist
 Jacob Derwin, Survivor contestant
 Peter Ragone, American public affairs expert

References

External links 
 
 Calhoun alumni website
 Calhoun Choral Program website

1958 establishments in New York (state)
Educational institutions established in 1958
Magnet schools in New York (state)
Public high schools in New York (state)
Schools in Nassau County, New York